José María de Tornel y Mendívil (1795–1853) was a 19th-century Mexican army general and politician who greatly influenced the career of President Antonio López de Santa Anna.

Birth 
José Maria Tornel y Mendívil was born March 1, 1795, in the town of Orizaba, Veracruz, New Spain to Julian Tornel, a prominent shopkeeper, and Manuela Jacinta Bernarda Mendívil Vidal.

Career 
Tornel was prominent among the "santanista," a group of politicians and officials who helped Santa Anna return to power frequently, despite defeats in the 1836 Texas Revolution and the 1846–48 Mexican–American War. Tornel advocated a federalist agenda in the 1820s. During that time, Tornel y Mendivil became Mexico's first president Guadalupe Victoria's right arm. Victoria named Tornel the Mexican ambassador to the United States in 1830. His mission was to inform Victoria on Americans' ambitions to take Texas. He was a bitter enemy of American policies. He complained to the Jackson administration about its failure to honor Mexico’s laws prohibiting further migration of Americans to Texas. He also tried and failed to secure a firm boundary along the Sabine River. Thanks his reports, Victoria's government came victorious in the Fredonian Rebellion. Although Tornel supported federalism during the Victoria presidency, he changed his political views to support Santa Anna's reactionary dictatorship in the 1850s. He helped orchestrate the Plan of Cuernavaca revolt in 1834. Tornel served as Minister of War, and helped plan the campaign that led to the Battle of the Alamo.

He was the President of the Chamber of Deputies in 1828 and 1841.

Works 
 The "Tornel Decree" of December 30, 1835 (a key element in the Texas Revolution, giving Santa Anna license to execute all prisoners).
 October 12, 1842 Speech to the Constituent Congress;
 Military Expenses of Iniquity, Barbarism and Despotism of the Spanish Government, Executed in the Towns of Orizava and Córdoba;
 Brief historical review of the most notable events in the Mexican nation;
 Brief historical review of the most notable events of the Mexican nation: [from 1821 to the present day];
 The Mexican Side of the Texas Revolution;

References

Bibliography

Further reading 
 

1795 births
1853 deaths
Mexican people of Basque descent
Presidents of the Chamber of Deputies (Mexico)
People of Mexican side in the Texas Revolution
Mexican military personnel of the Mexican–American War
19th-century Mexican politicians
Politicians from Veracruz
People from Orizaba
Governors of Veracruz
19th-century Mexican military personnel